Zhonghe station is a metro station on the Taipei Metro's Circular line when it was opened on 31 January 2020. It is located in Zhonghe District, New Taipei, Taiwan, at the intersection of Zhongshan Road and Jingping Road. It will be a transfer station with Wanda–Zhonghe–Shulin line in 2025.

Station layout

Exits
Single Exit: Southwest side of the intersection of Sec. 2, Zhongshan Rd. and Jingping Rd.

Around the station
Huazhong Bridge (300m north of the station)
Nan Shan Power Center (next to the station)
Gonglu 2nd. Village Park (550m southwest of the station)
Dinosaur Park (650m north of the station)
An Bang Park (700m south of the station)
Biheli Park (750m southwest of the station)
Zhonghe District Office (700m southeast of the station)
Zhonghe District Comprehensive Sports Ground (750m southeast of the station)
Zhonghe Elementary School (650m southeast of the station)
Guangji Temple (600m southeast of the station)
Nanshan High School (800m east of the station)

References

Zhonghe District
Circular line stations (Taipei Metro)
Railway stations opened in 2020
2020 establishments in Taiwan
Wanda–Zhonghe–Shulin line stations